New York skyscrapers may refer to:

 Skyscrapers identified in List of tallest buildings in New York City
 New York skyscrapers (O'Keeffe)

See also
 Cityscape
 Early skyscrapers